The 47th Cannes Film Festival was held from 12 to 23 May 1994. The Palme d'Or went to the American film Pulp Fiction directed by Quentin Tarantino.

The festival opened with The Hudsucker Proxy, directed by Joel Coen and closed with Serial Mom, directed by John Waters. Jeanne Moreau was the mistress of ceremonies.

Juries

Main competition
The following people were appointed as the Jury of the 1994 Official Selection:
Clint Eastwood (USA) Jury President
Catherine Deneuve (France) Vice president
Pupi Avati (Italy)
Guillermo Cabrera Infante (Cuba) (author)
Kazuo Ishiguro (UK)
Alexander Kaidanovsky (Russia)
Marie-Françoise Leclère (France)
Shin Sang-ok (South Korea)
Lalo Schifrin (Argentina)
Alain Terzian (France)

Camera d'Or
The following people were appointed as the Jury of the 1994 Caméra d'Or:
Marthe Keller (Switzerland) President
Hans Beerekamp
Josée Brossard (France)
Mario Dorminsky (Portugal)
An-Cha Flubacher Rhim
François Ode (France)
Georges Pansu
Jacques Zimmer (France)

Official selection

In competition - Feature film
The following feature films competed for the Palme d'Or: The Palme d'Or winner has been highlighted.

Un Certain Regard
The following films were selected for the competition of Un Certain Regard:

 The Adventures of Priscilla, Queen of the Desert by Stephan Elliott
 Bab El-Oued City by Merzak Allouache
 Bosna! by Bernard-Henri Lévy, Alain Ferrari
 The Broken Journey (Uttoran) by Sandip Ray
 The Butterfly's Dream (Il sogno della farfalla) by Marco Bellocchio
 Clean, Shaven by Lodge Kerrigan
 Cold Water (L'eau froide) by Olivier Assayas
 Down to Earth (Casa de Lava) by Pedro Costa
 Dreamplay (Drømspel) by Unni Straume
 Faust by Jan Švankmajer
 I Can't Sleep (J'ai pas sommeil) by Claire Denis
 I Like It Like That by Darnell Martin
 Johnnie Waterman (Jańcio Wodnik) by Jan Jakub Kolski
 Picture Bride by Kayo Hatta
 The Shipwrecked (Los náufragos) by Miguel Littín
 Sleep with Me by Rory Kelly
 The Story of Xinghua (Xinghua san yue tian) by Li Yin
 Suture by David Siegel & Scott McGehee
 Wild Reeds (Les Roseaux sauvages) by André Téchiné
 Without Compassion (Sin compasión) by Francisco José Lombardi
 Xime by Sana Na N'Hada

Films out of competition
The following films were selected to be screened out of competition:

 A Game with No Rules by Scott Reynolds
 The Dig by Neil Pardington
 The Dutch Master by Susan Seidelman
 Eau de la vie by Simon Baré
 I'm So Lonesome I Could Cry by Michael Hurst
 The Model (11 mins) by Jonathan Brough
 Montand by Jean Labib
 Serial Mom by John Waters
 Stroke by Christine Jeffs
 Vanished (Jeungbal) by Shin Sang-ok
 Wet by Bob Rafelson

Short film competition
The following short films competed for the Short Film Palme d'Or:

 Book of Dreams: Welcome to Crateland by Alex Proyas
 El héroe by Carlos Carrera
 Lemming Aid by Grant Lahood
 Parlez Après Le Signal Sonore by Olivier Jahan
 Passage by Raimund Krumme
 Sure To Rise by Niki Caro
 Syrup by Paul Unwin
 Una Strada Diritta Lunga by Werther Germondari, Maria Laura Spagnoli

Parallel sections

International Critics' Week
The following films were screened for the 33rd International Critics' Week (33e Semaine de la Critique):

Feature film competition

 Clerks by Kevin Smith (United States)
 See How They Fall (Regarde les hommes tomber) by Jacques Audiard (France)
 Zinat by Ebrahim Mokhtari (Iran)
 Nightwatch (Nattevagten) by Ole Bornedal (Denmark)
 Hatta Ishaar Akhar by Rashid Masharawi (Palestine, Netherlands)
 El Dirigible by Pablo Dotta (Uruguay)
 It Will Never Be Spring (Wildgroei) by Frouke Fokkema (Netherlands)

Short film competition

 Performance Anxiety by David Ewing (United States)
 One Night Stand by Bill Britten (United Kingdom)
 Poubelles by Olias Barco (France)
 Ponchada by Alejandra Moya (Mexico)
 Los Salteadores by Abi Feijo (Portugal)
 Home Away From Home by Maureen Blackwood (United Kingdom)
 Off Key by Karethe Linaae (Canada)

Directors' Fortnight
The following films were screened for the 1994 Directors' Fortnight (Quinzaine des Réalizateurs):

 71 Fragmente einer Chronologie des Zufalls by Michael Haneke
 A Caixa by Manoel de Oliveira
 Amateur by Hal Hartley
 Ap’to Hioni by Sotiris Goritsas
  by Jan Schütte
 Bandit Queen by Shekhar Kapur (India)
 Bei Kao Bei, Lian Dui Lian by Huang Jianxin
 Eat Drink Man Woman by Ang Lee
 Faut pas rire du bonheur by Guillaume Nicloux
 Fresh by Boaz Yakin
 Katya Ismailova by Valery Todorovsky
 Les Amoureux by Catherine Corsini
 Man, God, The Monster by Collectif
 Muriel's Wedding by P. J. Hogan
 Petits arrangements avec les morts by Pascale Ferran
 Pidä Huivista Kiinni, Tatjana by Aki Kaurismäki
 Senza pelle by Alessandro D'Alatri
 The Silences of the Palace by Moufida Tlatli
 Três Palmeiras by João Botelho
 Trop de bonheur by Cédric Kahn
 Crows (Wrony) by Dorota Kędzierzawska

Short films

 75 centilitres de prières by Jacques Maillot
 Deus ex machina by Vincent Mayrand
 Dimanche ou les fantômes by Laurent Achard
 Eternelles by Erick Zonca
 Troubles ou la journée d’une femme ordinaire by Laurent Bouhnik

Awards

Official awards
The following films and people received the 1994 Official selection awards:
Palme d'Or: Pulp Fiction - Quentin Tarantino
Grand Prize of the Jury: 
 To Live (Huozhe) - Zhang Yimou
 Burnt by the Sun (Utomlyonnye solntsem) - Nikita Mikhalkov
Best Director: Nanni Moretti for Caro diario
Best Screenplay: Grosse Fatigue - Michel Blanc
Best Actress: Virna Lisi for Queen Margot (La Reine Margot)
Best Actor: Ge You for To Live (Huozhe)
Jury Prize: Queen Margot (La Reine Margot) - Patrice Chéreau
Golden Camera
Caméra d'Or: Coming to Terms with the Dead (Petits arrangements avec les morts) by Pascale Ferran
Golden Camera - Special Mention: The Silences of the Palace (Samt el qusur) by Moufida Tlatli
Short films
Short Film Palme d'Or: El héroe by Carlos Carrera
 First Jury Prize: Lemming Aid by Grant Lahood
 Second Jury Prize: Syrup by Paul Unwin

Independent awards
FIPRESCI Prizes
Bab El-Oued City by Merzak Allouache (Un Certain Regard)
Exotica by Atom Egoyan (In competition)
Commission Supérieure Technique
 Technical Grand Prize: Pitof (special effects) in Dead Tired (Grosse Fatigue)
Ecumenical Jury
 Prize of the Ecumenical Jury: 
 To Live (Huozhe) - Zhang Yimou
 Burnt by the Sun (Utomlyonnye solntsem) - Nikita Mikhalkov
Award of the Youth
Foreign Film: Clerks by Kevin Smith
French Film: Happy, Too Happy by Cédric Kahn
Awards in the frame of International Critics' Week
Mercedes-Benz Award: Clerks by Kevin Smith
Canal+ Award: Performance Anxiety by David Ewing
Kodak Short Film Award: Éternelles by Erick Zonca

References

Media
INA: Opening of the 1994 Festival (commentary in French)
INA: List of winners of the 1994 festival (commentary in French)

External links

1994 Cannes Film Festival (web.archive) 
Official website Retrospective 1994 
Cannes Film Festival:1994 at Internet Movie Database

Cannes Film Festival
Cannes Film Festival
Cannes Film Festival
Cannes